Charles Taylor Doxey (July 13, 1841 – April 30, 1898) was an American Civil War veteran who served for just over six weeks as a U.S. Representative from Indiana in 1883.

Biography
Born in Tippecanoe County, Indiana, Doxey moved with his mother to Minnesota in 1855 and worked on a farm.
Later moved to Fairbury, Illinois, where he attended the public schools.
He moved to Anderson, Indiana.

Civil War 
He entered the service as first sergeant of Company A, Nineteenth Regiment, Indiana Volunteer Infantry, in July 1861.
He was promoted to second lieutenant, subsequently resigned, and then became captain of Company K, Sixteenth Indiana Infantry.

Post-war career
He engaged in the manufacture of staves and headings.
He served as member of the Indiana State Senate in 1876.
He served as member of the board of directors in the first natural-gas companies of Anderson.

Congress 
Doxey was elected as a Republican to the Forty-seventh Congress to fill the vacancy caused by the death of Godlove S. Orth and served from January 17 to March 3, 1883.
He was an unsuccessful candidate for election in 1884 to the Forty-ninth Congress.

Later career and death 
He resumed former business activities.
He died in Anderson, Indiana, April 30, 1898.
He was interred in Maplewood Cemetery.

References

1841 births
1898 deaths
Republican Party Indiana state senators
People from Tippecanoe County, Indiana
Union Army officers
People from Fairbury, Illinois
Politicians from Anderson, Indiana
19th-century American politicians
Military personnel from Illinois
Republican Party members of the United States House of Representatives from Indiana